The Guugu Yimithirr, also spelt Gugu Yimithirr and also known as Kokoimudji, are an Aboriginal Australian people of Far North Queensland, many of whom today live at Hopevale, which is the administrative centre of Hopevale Shire. It is also the name of their language. They were both a coastal and inland people, the former clans referring to themselves as a "saltwater people".

Language
Guugu Yimidhirr, meaning 'language/speaking (guugu) 'this way' (yimi-thirr), was one of the earliest Australian languages to be recorded, since Sydney Parkinson took down a list of 200 words during Captain Cook's stop-over in the area in 1770. The major dialects are dhalun-dhirr, spoken on the coastal areas, and waguurr-ga, the inland vernacular. It is still spoken by approximately 200 people, and was listed by Peter Austin as one of the languages at immediate risk of extinction.

Guugu Yimithirr had several dialects: dhalan-dhirr ('with the sea'); wagurrr-ga ('of the outside'); guugu nyiiguudyi; guugu nyalaadyi; guugu yinaa and guugu diirrurru. Because they intermarried widely with tribes speaking other tongues, it was not unusual for Guugu Yimithirr people to be familiar with several languages.

Country
The traditional territory of the Guugu Yimithirr speakers extended from the Endeavour River outlet inland, ranged as far north as the mouth of the Starcke river, or, according to Norman Tindale, to the southern vicinity of Cape Flattery. Westwards it reached the source of the Jack River and south to Battle Camp, north-west of Cooktown. Dialects of the same language were spoken north of Cape Bedford and the McIvor River, and inland as far as the source of the Jack River. Captain Cook left a few pigs on the land, and they bred quickly, to become a major local source of food.

Society and customs
Guugu Yimithirr practice certain forms of social avoidance. The language itself has a form of avoidance language in which, speaking in the presence of certain family members (like a man's father-in-law or brother-in-law), one must adopt a different vocabulary from that normally employed. In everyday conversation 'the man is going' is bama dhaday. In the presence of certain kin, this must be altered to yambaal bali. Speaking was totally forbidden in the presence of one's mother-in-law, one being obliged to sit, with bowed head, silently (guugu-mu).

The system of spatial coordination inscribed in the language is totally different from that in Western languages, where the reference system is relative with respect to the subject. In Guugu Yimidhirr, as in Kayardild space is rendered in absolute terms, like the cardinal points, north, south, east, west, independent of whether something is in front of, behind, to the left or right of a person. The language thus provides them with a mental map, allowing quite a precise dead-reckoning of all points around them wherever they are. For example, if your Guugu Yimidhirr guest, on leaving your house, had to inform you he or she had left her tobacco behind, they would be required to state grammatically in their native language something like: I left it on the southern table in the western side of your house.

History of contact

Lt. James Cook anchored at the mouth of the Endeavour River at the site of modern Cooktown, on 11 June 1770 after their ship, the HM Bark Endeavour was damaged on a reef, and stayed in the area for seven weeks while repair work was done on the hull. Though the modern population was displaced and pushed 30 miles northwards, this was the traditional land of the Guugu Yimithirr. The expedition's members found them to be quite friendly, though they initially kept their distance. After a month, the Europeans were approached by five men, and an amicable relationship was established, as they were shown the Endeavour. The day after, things deteriorated quickly when, while visiting the Endeavour they found a catch of local turtles, and expected a share of the harvest, which Cook, already strained to feed his own, declined to do. He offered them bread, which they refused with disgust. Different concepts of hospitality and the rules of sharing clashed. Soon after, the natives set fire to grass in the bay, and in retaliation, some received injuries from shot.

One of the members of the crew, Joseph Banks's botanical draughtsman Sydney Parkinson, set down in his journal (published posthumously as A Journal of a Voyage to the South Seas) a sketch of the local people. He described them as diminutive and small boned, agile, their skin painted with red and white ochre, with wood-sooty skin and generally given to shaving their hair off. They practiced nose piercing. Women wore a feather headdress. They used wood from the ficus riduola as a rasp to sharpen their spears, which were tipped with bone. Their languages was quite mellifluous, with clear enunciation.

History of settlement
The tribes of the area around Cooktown were decimated, the Guugu Yimithirr being "substantially exterminated", by a variety of factors: large-scale massacres, the kidnapping of women for rape and the abduction of their children, together with the lethal impact of consuming the opium that Chinese contractors paid to them for their work as hired labourers, and alcohol abuse.

On 20 February 1879 there were 28 Aboriginal men shot and drowned at Cape Bedford. Cooktown-based Native Police Sub-inspector Stanhope O'Connor with his troopers hunted down and trapped in a narrow gorge, a group of 28 Guugu-Yimidhirr men and 13 women. None of the men escaped: 24 were shot down on the beach, while four swam into the sea, never to be seen again.

In 1885 a curfew was imposed on them, disallowing their movement after dusk. He stayed on with his converted congregation right through to the Second World War, when the population was relocated inland from Rockhampton. Schwartz, who had been there since the age of 19 and who had forgotten to take naturalisation, had mastered the language, contributing greatly to the retention of traditional knowledge, was interned as an enemy alien at 74. The colder climate had serious consequences for the displaced congregation, and many died.

The word kangaroo
Cook reported sighting on Sunday 24 June 1770 an animal which was:
of a light mouse Colour and the full size of a Grey Hound, and shaped in every respect like one, with a long tail, which it carried like a Grey hound; in short, I should have taken it for a wild dog but for its walking or running, in which it jumpd like a Hare or Deer.
Sir Joseph Banks entered into his journal that the natives called it a "Kangooroo". The animal was thereafter called by this name by Europeans after settlement began. When Captain Phillip King stopped over on the same coast in 1820, however, and made the same enquiry, he was told that the animal in question was called minnar/meenuah. There arose an urban legend that in fact what the word 'kangaroo' must have meant, when the indigenous people of the Endeavour River responded to the incomprehensible English query, was "I don't know". Light was shed on the point by the American anthropologist John Haviland, who studied the Guugu Yimithirr language intensively from 1971 onwards. He discovered that in fact a word like 'kangaroo' did exist in Guugu Yimithirr, namely gangurru. This denoted however a species, the large grey kangaroo, that was relatively rare in the coastal territory, while the other word reported by King was an approximation to their word for meat or edible animal (minha). Cook's report and reputation as a precise observer was vindicated.

Alternative names
 ?Boolcanara.
 Gogo-Yimidjir
 Gug-Imudji
 Jimidir
 Kokojimidir
 Kokojimoji. (southern pronunciation)
 Kokoyimidir.(northern pronunciation)
 Kookcymma (typo)
 Kookoyuma

Source:

Some words
 dhawuunh. 'friend'.
 Ngayu mayi buda-nhu. 'I'm hungry' (lit. 'I want to eat food'(mayi).

Notes

Citations

Sources

External links
 Bibliography of Guugu Yimidhirr people and language resources, at the Australian Institute of Aboriginal and Torres Strait Islander Studies
 Guugu Yimidhirr (Cooktown) Community Language Journey Digital Story, State Library of Queensland
 Guugu Yimidhirr (Hope Vale) Community Language Journey Digital Story

Aboriginal peoples of Queensland
Far North Queensland